Hani may refer to:

People
 Hani (name)
 Hani (producer), a record producer and remixer from New York City
 Hani (singer), a South Korean singer and member of EXID
 Hani people, an ethnic group of China and Vietnam

Places
 Hani, an island in Iceland, part of the Vestmannaeyjar islands
 Hani, Turkey, a district of Diyarbakır Province
 Hani, Ghana, a town in Tain District, Bono Region; see Bono state

Other uses
 Hani (god), a minor god of the Babylonians and Akkadians
 Hani language, the language of many Hani people
 Hani, an alien race in The Chanur novels of C. J. Cherryh
 Hani, ISO 15924 code for the Chinese script
 "Hani?", the Turkish entry in the Eurovision Song Contest 1982

Language and nationality disambiguation pages